Hindsiclava ignorata is an extinct species of sea snail, a marine gastropod mollusc in the family Pseudomelatomidae, the turrids and allies.

Distribution
Fossils of this marine species were found in Upper Pliocene strata in Chile.

References

 Frassinetti, D.; Covacevich, V. 1995. Moluscos del Plioceno Superior marino de Isla Guamblín, Archipélago de los Chonos, sur de Chile. Revista Geológica de Chile 22: 47-73

ignorata
Gastropods described in 1995